Cornwall Park may refer to:

Cornwall Church in Bellingham, Washington (formerly known as Cornwall Park Church of God)
Cornwall Park (Bellingham, Washington)
Cornwall Park, Auckland The park around One Tree Hill, New Zealand (which is distinct from the hill, and much larger).